Satin Circus was a Finnish pop band founded in 2010. The group was born out of the desire of four friends to play positive and energetic pop music together. The band released their first studio album, Expectations, on February 14, 2014. The band took part in Uuden Musiikin Kilpailu 2015, the Finnish selection for Eurovision Song Contest 2015 with the song "Crossroads". The band finished second, losing only to Pertti Kurikan Nimipäivät.

Members 
 Kristian Westerling – Lead vocals, guitar
 Axel Kalland – Keyboards, saxophone, backing vocals
 Paul Uotila – Lead vocals from 2015, Bass
 Olli Halonen – Drums, backing vocals

Discography

Singles 
 "EMMA" (2013)
 "If You Love Me" (2014)
 "Crossroads" (2015)
 "Come back" (2015)

References

External links 
Official Satin Circus website

Finnish musical groups
Finnish pop music groups
Sony Music